is a Japanese actor, martial artist, and writer of Korean descent.

Biography
Ihara is a Japanese person of Korean descent, born on November 6, 1963, in Kitakyūshū as Yun Yu-gu (윤유구/尹惟久) and who grew up in Ikuno-ku, Osaka. He is a graduate of Imamiya Senior High School, Naniwa-ku, Osaka.

Career
Ihara joined the Japan Action Enterprise, a theater troupe founded by Sonny Chiba, after leaving high school. Soon after, he began to work in numerous feature films and television dramas, including the 1996 NHK series Futarikko. In 2006, Ihara appeared as the Baron Takeichi Nishi in Clint Eastwood's critically acclaimed Academy Award-winning film Letters from Iwo Jima, introducing him to a wider international audience.

Ihara authored a book, published in Japan by Amoeba Books.

Appearances

Films

Kotaro Makaritoru (1984) - Sadoya Shunper
Bakayarō! Watashi Okkote Masu (1988, Kōwa International and Shochiku) - Kazuki Numayama (Episode 1)
Byôin e ikô (1990) - Hizaki
Hong Kong Paradise (1990, Toho) - Ando
Onna ga ichiban niau shokugyo (1990) - Fumio Tsukada
Daida Kyōshi Akiba, Shinken Desu! (1991, Toei and Nippon TV)
Jingi (1991, Toei)
Shura no Teiou (1994)
Yonshima Monogatari (1995, Ezaki Guriko)
Gamera: Guardian of the Universe (1995, Daiei) - Yoshinari Yonemori
Abunai Deka Returns (1996, Nippon TV, Toei)
Hiroin! Naniwa bombers (1998)
Gamera 3: Awakening of Irys (1999, Daiei)
Drug (2001) - Masashi Kurata
Minna no Ie (2001, Fuji TV, Toho) - Arakawa Jr
Hanochi (2004)
Hinagon (2005) - Ichiro Igarashi
Retribution (2006) - Tôru Miyaji
Letters from Iwo Jima (2006) - Baron Takeichi Nishi
Heat Island (2007) - Kakizawa
Ginmaku ban Sushi ôji!: Nyûyôku e iku (2008) - Haruki / Rin
Tsukiji uogashi sandaime (2008) - Eiji
Ninja (2009) - Masazuka
Nakumonka (2009)
Thirteen Assassins (2010) - Kujuro Hirayama
Dirty Hearts (2011, Shindo Renmei) - Takahashi
The Tang of Lemon (2011)
Ai to makoto (2012) - Kenta Zaô
Brave Hearts: Umizaru (2012) - Kazuhiko Shima
Aibou: The Movie III (2014)
Samurai Hustle (2014) - Danzo Kumogakure
Last Knights (2015) - Ito
Ashura 2003 (2015)
Sutoreiyâzu kuronikuru (2015) - Koichiro Watase
Kazoku no hi (2016)
Chô kôsoku! Sankin kôtai ritânzu (2016) - Danzo Kumogakure
Iine! Iine! Iine! (2016)
The Old Capital (2016)
Lámen Shop (2018) - Kazuo
They Say Nothing Stays the Same (2019)
Signal: The Movie (2021) - Junki Aoki
Yakuza Princess (TBA) - Takeshi

Television dramas
Shadow Warriors　(Hattori Hanzō: Kage no Gundan series) (Fuji TV, 1980-)
Kage no Gundan IV
Kage no Gundam Bakumatsu-hen
Takeda Shingen (1988 NHK Taiga drama; portraying Oda Nobuyuki)
Oishii no ga suki (TBS, 1989)
Kyō, Futari (1990 NHK morning drama)
Yonimo Kimyōna Monogatari (1991, Fuji TV)
Futarikko (1996, NHK morning drama) - Masao kuroiwa
Only You ~Aisarete~ (1996, Nippon TV)
Ichigen no Koto (2000, NHK)
Star no Koi (2001, Fuji TV)
Kowloon de Aimashō (2002, TV Asahi)
Kochira Hon Ikegami Sho (2002, TBS)
Mibu Gishi Den ~Shinsengumi de Ichiban Tsuyokatta Otoko~ (2002; portraying Hijikata Toshizō)
Koi wa Tattakai (2003, TV Asahi)
Kochira Hon Ikegami Sho 2 (2003, TBS])
Chūshingura ~ Ketsudan no Toki (2003, TV Tokyo; portraying Horibe Yasubei)
Sky High 2 (2004, TV Asahi)
Shinsengumi! (2004 NHK Taiga drama; portraying Sasaki Tadasaburō)
Last Christmas (2004, Fuji TV)
Kochira Hon Ikegami Sho 4 (2004, TBS)
Magari Kado no Kanojo (2005, Fuji TV) - Masamitsu Horiuchi
Shiawase ni Naritai! (2005, TBS)
Koi no Jikan (2005, TBS)
Grave of the Fireflies (2005, Nippon TV) - Genzo Sawano (Hisako's husband)
Umeko (2005, TBS)
Kuroi Taiyō (2006, TV Asahi)
Jotei (2007, TV Asahi)
Team Batista no Eiko (2008, Fuji TV) - Kiryu Kyoichi
Hanako to An (2014; portraying Ando Kippei, NHK Asadora)
Hana Moyu (2015 NHK Taiga drama; portraying Sakamoto Ryōma)
The Naked Director Season 2 (2021, Netflix)

Anime
Karasu (1995, Toei)

Theater
We Love JAC (1986)
Jōji ta JAC Kōen
Mayonaka no Party (1991)
Honkon Rhapsody (1993)
Dā! Dā! Dā! (1993)
Hikoma ga Yuku (2002)
Blood Gets in Your Eyes (2003)
Rōnin Gai (2004)
Kātenkōru (2005)
shuffle (2005)
Letters from Iwo Jima (2006)

Other programs
Kimama ni Toygyazā (Mainichi Broadcasting System, Kansai Local)
Ōra no Izumi (December 13, 2006, TV Asahi)

Books
Kokorozashite Sōrō (author)

References

External links
K Dash
Drive Music

21st-century Japanese male actors
Japanese male film actors
Japanese male actors of Korean descent
Japanese male television actors
Japanese male stage actors
People from Kitakyushu
Male actors from Osaka
Zainichi Korean people
1963 births
Living people